Osa de la Vega Solar Plant is a 30 MW solar photovoltaic power plant located in the Province of Cuenca (Spain).

See also 

 List of power stations in Spain
 List of photovoltaic power stations

References 

Photovoltaic power stations in Spain
Energy in Castilla–La Mancha